Chookaki Bala is a village in Tamin Rural District, in the Corrin of Zahedan County, Sistan and Baluchestan Province, Iran. At the 2006 census, its population was 38, in 8 families.

References 

Populated places in Zahedan County